Bishop (formerly Bishop Creek) is a city in California, United States. It is the largest populated place and only incorporated city in Inyo County. The city was named after Bishop Creek, flowing out of the Sierra Nevada; the creek was named after Samuel Addison Bishop, a settler in the Owens Valley. Bishop is a commercial and residential center, while many vacation destinations and tourist attractions in the Sierra Nevada are located nearby.

The population of the city was 3,879 at the 2010 Census, up from 3,575 at the 2000 Census. The population of the built-up zone containing Bishop is much larger; more than 14,500 people live in a compact area that includes Bishop, West Bishop, Dixon Lane-Meadow Creek, and the Bishop Paiute Reservation. It is by far the largest settlement in Inyo County.

A number of western films were shot in Bishop, including movies starring John Wayne, Charlton Heston and Joel McCrea.

History
The Bishop Creek post office operated from 1870 to 1889 and from 1935 to 1938. The first Bishop post office opened in 1889.

In order to support the growth aspirations of the City of Los Angeles, water was diverted from the Owens River into the Los Angeles Aqueduct in 1913. From the 1910s to 1930s, the Los Angeles Department of Water and Power purchased much of the valley for water rights and control. The result was substantial change to the Owens Valley culture and environment. The economy of Bishop suffered when farmers sold their land. Jack Foley, a Bishop resident and sound effects specialist, mitigated the economic loss by persuading several Los Angeles studio bosses that the town of Bishop would be ideal as a location to shoot westerns.

History and heritage 
The City of Bishop was named for one of the first European settlers in the area, Samuel A. Bishop. Owens Lake was named for Richard Owens, a member of John C. Fremont's 1845 exploration party which included Kit Carson and Ed Kern. Later the entire valley became known as The Owens Valley (see First Settlers below). The Paiute Indians called Owens Lake by the name of "Pacheta" and the Owens River "Wakopee." Geographically, Inyo County is today the second largest county in California with a population of slightly over 18,000 residents. The county is so big that several eastern states put together would fit neatly within its boundaries. The "Inyo" in Inyo County is commonly believed to be a Paiute word meaning "dwelling place of the great spirit," although some scholars are now convinced that it is a mistranslation of the word Indio, which is Spanish for Indian. It is possible that the Paiute were trying to explain to the earliest English speaking settlers in the Owens Valley that this was their land by using a form of "Indio" they had learned from other Indian tribes, who in turn, had learned it from the Spanish or Mexicans, not realizing that not all Europeans spoke the same language. Thus Inyo may actually mean "Indian Land."

First American settlers 

The first American explorers in the Owens Valley of Eastern California included the famous mountain men Jedediah Smith in 1826 and Joseph Walker in 1834. This remote area of California had never been explored by the Spanish and even though it was shown as Mexican territory on early maps, the Eastern Sierra region remained unvisited by them. Present day Walker Lake in western Nevada, the Walker River on the California/Nevada border and Walker Pass in the southern Sierra were named for their discoverer, Joseph Walker.

The most renowned early explorer to visit the area was John C. Fremont. He was the first Republican candidate to run for President of the United States in 1856 and later a famous Union Civil War general. Officially sanctioned by the federal government, his 1845 mapping party to the Eastern Sierra included the celebrated Indian scout Kit Carson, for whom the capitol of Nevada, Carson City, was named. Also in the party were Ed Kern for whom Kern County, California was named, and Richard Owens, who gave his name to the Owens Lake near Lone Pine and later the Owens Valley itself.

The City of Bishop came into being due to the need for beef in a booming mining camp some eighty miles to the north, Aurora, Nevada, (Aurora was believed to be on the California side of the border at that time and was the county seat of Mono County, California). In 1861 cattlemen drove herds of cattle some three hundred miles from the great San Joaquin Valley of California, through the southern Sierra at Walker Pass, up the Owens Valley, and then through Adobe Meadows to Aurora. Along the way, some cattlemen noticed that the unsettled northern Owens Valley was perfect for raising livestock.

To avoid the long journey from the other side of the mountains, a few of them decided to settle in the valley. Driving some 600 head of cattle and 50 horses, Samuel Addison Bishop, his wife, and several hired hands arrived in the Owens Valley on August 22, 1861, from Fort Tejón in the Tehachapi Mountains. Along with Henry Vansickle, Charles Putnam, Allen Van Fleet, and the McGee brothers, Bishop was one of the first white settlers in the valley.

The cattlemen were soon followed by sheepmen who initially struggled with a lack of forage for their stock in the area. Remnants of these early settlers' stone corrals and fences can still be seen north of Bishop along Highway 395 in Round Valley (barb wire fencing was not invented until 1873). Establishing a homestead, the San Francis Ranch, along the creek which still bears his name, Samuel Bishop set up a market to sell beef to the miners and business owners in Aurora .

One of the residents of Aurora at that time was a young Samuel Clemens who later gained fame as author Mark Twain (see Twain's Roughing It for his comments on this area).

By 1862, a frontier settlement (and later town), known as Bishop Creek, was established a couple of miles east of the San Francis Ranch. Though the town continues to prosper, the only reminder of Samuel Bishop's ranch today is a monument placed near the original site at the corner of Highway 168 West and Red Hill Road, two miles west of downtown Bishop.

In 1866, the County of Inyo was established from part of Tulare County. The Eastern High Sierra and the Owens Valley was the westernmost frontier in America at that time. In 1871, Daniel Bruhn was one of 41 wranglers herding some 3,000 wild Spanish mustangs from Stockton, California, to Texas. Their travels took them over the High Sierra and into the remote Owens Valley, where they lost over 500 head of horses. The descendants of those mustangs still roam wild on the California/Nevada border just north of Bishop.

Water conflicts of the Owens Valley 

Between 1905 and 1907, most of the land in the Owens Valley was purchased from farmers and ranchers at bargain prices by William Mulholland, superintendent of the Water Department for the City of Los Angeles under the guise of a local irrigation project. Their real goal was to send Owens Valley water south to Los Angeles. By the time the now famous Los Angeles Aqueduct was completed in 1913, it was too late for valley residents to take any action.

The City of Los Angeles receives 70% of its water from the Owens Valley and the Eastern High Sierra. With the diversion of water to Los Angeles, the Owens Lake and lower Owens River dried up and many valley residents were forced to pack up and leave the area forever. For a number of years, Owens Valley residents expressed much animosity toward the City of Los Angeles as can be seen in Dry Ditches, a little book of poems published in 1934 by the Parcher family of Bishop. The Owens Valley–City of Los Angeles conflict was the inspiration of the 1974 film Chinatown, starring Jack Nicholson.

Native American cultural heritage 

Indigenous peoples still live in and near Bishop. They now reside on four reservations. The southernmost is the Lone Pine Indian Reservation; northward is Fort Independence Reservation and Big Pine Indian Reservation. The largest and northernmost is the Bishop Indian Reservation.

Geography
Bishop lies west of the Owens River at the northern end of the Owens Valley.

The city is located on U.S. Route 395, the main north–south artery through the Owens Valley, connecting the Inland Empire to Reno, Nevada. US 395 also connects Bishop to Los Angeles via State Route 14 through Palmdale. Bishop is the western terminus of U.S. Route 6. The Paiute-Shoshone Indians of the Bishop Community of the Bishop Colony control land just west of the town. The Los Angeles Department of Water and Power (DWP) controls much of the upstream and surrounding area.

Bishop is immediately to the east of the Sierra Nevada, and west of the White Mountains. Numerous peaks are within a short distance of Bishop, including Mount Humphreys to the west, White Mountain Peak to the northeast, and pyramidal Mount Tom northwest of town. Basin Mountain is viewed to the west from Bishop as it rises above the Buttermilks.

Bishop is known as the "Mule Capital of the World" and a week-long festival called Bishop Mule Days has been held since 1969 during the week of Memorial Day, celebrating the contributions of pack mules to the area. The festival attracts many tourists, primarily from the Southern California area.

Bishop is well known in the rock climbing community. Near the city are numerous climbing spots that attract visitors from around the world. There are over 2,000 bouldering problems in Bishop.  The two main types of rock are volcanic tuff (at the Happy and Sad boulders) and granite (at the Buttermilks).

Notable locations 
Ancient Bristlecone Pine Forest
Bishop Area Chamber of Commerce
Bishop Visitors Bureau
Eastern Sierra Regional Airport
Inyo National Forest Supervisor's Office
Keoughs Hot Springs
Laws Rail Museum
Paiute Indian Reservation
Paiute-Shoshone Cultural Center Museum

Climate
Measurable precipitation occurs on an average of 26 days annually.

There is an average of 3 nights of sub  lows, 139 nights where the low reaches the freezing mark, 104 days with + highs, and 29 days with + highs. Diurnals are wide enough that temperatures both during summer and winter afternoons resemble Southern Spain's interior, whereas nights in both seasons are similar to those found on the Baltic Sea in far northern Europe.

Cold daytime highs and warm nights are rare, but have happened on occasion. Ice days are infrequent with the warmer climate of recent decades. Between 1991 and 2020 the coldest maximum temperature of the year averaged  with the coldest days barely remaining below freezing.

Demographics

The demographic information below applies to residents living within the city limits of Bishop; 3,879 in downtown Bishop.

The "greater Bishop area," which includes unincorporated nearby neighborhoods such as West Bishop, Meadow Creek-Dixon Lane, Wilkerson Ranch, Rocking K, Mustang Mesa, Round Valley and the Bishop Paiute Tribe includes an additional 11,000 residents.

2010
The 2010 United States Census reported that Bishop had a population of 3,879. The racial makeup of Bishop was 2,867 (73.9%) White, 22 (0.6%) African American, 91 (2.3%) Native American, 61 (1.6%) Asian, 1 (0.0%) Pacific Islander, 723 (18.6%) from other races, and 114 (2.9%) from two or more races. Hispanic or Latino of any race were 1,200 persons (30.9%).

The Census reported that 3,771 people (97.2% of the population) lived in households, 36 (0.9%) lived in non-institutionalized group quarters, and 72 (1.9%) were institutionalized.

There were 1,748 households, out of which 499 (28.5%) had children under the age of 18 living in them, 574 (32.8%) were opposite-sex married couples living together, 181 (10.4%) had a female householder with no husband present, 99 (5.7%) had a male householder with no wife present.  There were 143 (8.2%) unmarried opposite-sex partnerships, and 10 (0.6%) same-sex married couples or partnerships. 767 households (43.9%) were made up of individuals, and 288 (16.5%) had someone living alone who was 65 years of age or older. The average household size was 2.16.  There were 854 families (48.9% of all households); the average family size was 3.07.

The population was spread out, with 925 people (23.8%) under the age of 18, 298 people (7.7%) aged 18 to 24, 1,014 people (26.1%) aged 25 to 44, 1,031 people (26.6%) aged 45 to 64, and 611 people (15.8%) who were 65 years of age or older.  The median age was 38.9 years. For every 100 females, there were 99.8 males.  For every 100 females age 18 and over, there were 97.7 males.

The homeowner vacancy rate was 0.3%; the rental vacancy rate was 5.8%.  1,353 people (34.9% of the population) lived in owner-occupied housing units and 2,418 people (62.3%) lived in rental housing units.

2000

As of the census of 2000, there were 3,575 people, 1,684 households, and 831 families residing in the city. The racial makeup of the city was 84.6% White, 0.2% Black or African American, 2.0% Native American, 1.4% Asian, <0.1% Pacific Islander, 6.5% from other races, and 5.4% from two or more races.  17.4% of the population were Hispanic or Latino of any race.

There were 1,684 households, out of which 26.2% had children under the age of 18 living with them, 33.5% were married couples living together, 11.8% had a female householder with no husband present, and 50.6% were non-families. 44.2% of all households were made up of individuals, and 19.1% had someone living alone who was 65 years of age or older.  The average household size was 2.08 and the average family size was 2.93.

In the city the population was spread out, with 24.2% under the age of 18, 7.3% from 18 to 24, 26.5% from 25 to 44, 22.8% from 45 to 64, and 19.2% who were 65 years of age or older.  The median age was 40 years. For every 100 females, there were 91.8 males.  For every 100 females age 18 and over, there were 90.0 males.

The median income for a household in the city was $27,338, and the median income for a family was $34,423. Males had a median income of $23,433 versus $24,545 for females. The per capita income for the city was $17,660.  About 14.0% of families and 16.3% of the population were below the poverty line, including 23.0% of those under age 18 and 6.0% of those age 65 or over.

Politics and government
It is also in the 8th State Senate district.

Bishop maintains its own police force (the only one in Inyo County), but also has a substation of the Inyo County Sheriff's Department on the outskirts of the city. The California Highway Patrol also has an office in town.

Transportation

U.S. Route 395 is the four lane divided highway serving Bishop between southern California and Reno while U.S. 6 provides access to Tonopah and other communities in Nevada. The junction of U.S. Routes 395 and 6 is one of only two junctions of two U.S. Routes in California, the other being the junction of U.S. Routes 199 and 101 in Crescent City.

The Eastern Sierra Regional Airport provides general aviation services in addition to seasonal scheduled passenger airline service nonstop to Los Angeles, San Francisco and Denver operated by SkyWest Airlines flying as United Express with regional jet aircraft on behalf of United Airlines.

Eastern Sierra Transit offers bus service as far north as Reno, Nevada, and as far south as Lancaster, California.

In popular culture

A number of western films were shot in Bishop:

 Flaming Guns (1932)
 The Fourth Horseman (1932)
 Blue Steel (1934)
 Roll Along, Cowboy (1937)
 Cassidy of Bar 20 (1938)
 The Cowboy and the Lady (1938)
 Three Faces West (1940)
 Silver River (1948)
 Frenchie (1951)
 The Law and Jake Wade (1958)
 Will Penny (1967)
The song "Bishop, CA" from Xiu Xiu's 2006 album The Air Force was named after Bishop.

Notable residents
Horace M. Albright, the second director of the National Park Service, was born in Bishop in 1890.
Television director and producer David Barrett also calls Bishop home, along with his brother, stuntman and NASCAR driver Stanton Barrett. They are grandsons to Dave McCoy, founder of the Mammoth Mountain Ski Area.
Actor Robert Bray, who portrayed forest ranger Corey Stuart in CBS's Lassie from 1964 to 1968 and Simon Kane in ABC's Stagecoach West from 1960 to 1961, retired to Bishop, where he died in 1983 at the age of sixty-five.
Artist Robert Clunie lived and painted in Bishop for decades.
Elisha Vanslyck Cook Jr. was a character actor in dozens of films, including The Maltese Falcon, The Big Sleep, Magnum P.I., The House on Haunted Hill and Shane, who lived in Bishop until his death in Big Pine in 1995.
Mountaineer Peter Croft lives in Bishop.
Major Kern W. Dunagan US Army Medal of Honor recipient graduated from Bishop High School.
Actor Trevor Donovan was born in Bishop.
Former child actor Richard Eyer, who played Bray's son in Stagecoach West, was a teacher in Bishop, until he retired.
Cowboy poet Curley Fletcher (1892–1954) was raised in Bishop.
Jack Foley is the namesake for the art of adding sound effects to films, with the profession named Foley artist.
Major League Baseball pitcher Hal Gregg lived in Bishop until his death there in 1991.
Jill Kinmont, noted ski racer who was paralyzed in a 1955 accident, grew up in Bishop. Her life story was turned into two major Hollywood movies The Other Side of the Mountain and its sequel The Other Side of the Mountain Part 2''.
Actor Bill Mumy spent part of his childhood and adolescence in Bishop, where his father was a cattle rancher.
Bishop was the home of Galen Rowell, and his wife Barbara, before their death at the Eastern Sierra Regional Airport.
Tracy Smith, Olympian, world-record holder in the 3-mile, and 6-time AAU national champion, was a Bishop resident from the 1970s to the 1990s, as he coached the Bishop Union High School track team distance runners.
Artist Alex Stenzel lives in Bishop.
Author Claire Vaye Watkins was born in Bishop.
Matt Williams, former Major League Baseball third baseman and former manager of the Washington Nationals, was born in Bishop.

Media

AM radio
 KBOV 1230 AM

FM radio
 KWTW 88.5 FM
 KSRW 92.5 FM
 KRHV 93.3 FM
 KIBS 100.7 FM
 KMMT 106.5 FM

Television
 KVME-TV channel 20

References

External links
 City of Bishop official website
 Bishop,CA Visitor Center/Chamber of Commerce
 Bishop Community/Information Webpage

 
Incorporated cities and towns in California
Cities in Inyo County, California
Owens Valley
Populated places in the Sierra Nevada (United States)
Populated places established in 1903
1903 establishments in California